The 1992 U.S. Women's Open was the 47th U.S. Women's Open, held July 23–27 at Oakmont Country Club in Oakmont, Pennsylvania, a suburb northeast of Pittsburgh.

The champion was Patty Sheehan, the winner of an 18-hole Monday playoff over runner-up Juli Inkster, 72 to 74. Tied for the lead after the third round at 211 (−2) on the par-71 course, both players shot 69 in the fourth round to finish at 280 (−4) for the championship, four strokes ahead of third-place finisher Donna Andrews. Rain delays during the first two rounds extended play to the following day.

The site of many U.S. Opens, PGA Championships, and U.S. Amateurs, this was the first U.S. Women's Open and women's major at Oakmont. The championship returned to Oakmont in 2010, won by Paula Creamer.

This was the first U.S. Women's Open for Annika Sörenstam, then a 21-year-old amateur; she made the cut on the number at 151 (+9) and finished with 308 (+24), tied for 64th.

This championship coincided with the opening weekend of the 1992 Summer Olympics in Barcelona, Spain.

Past champions in the field

Made the cut

Source:

Missed the cut

Source:

Round summaries

First round
Thursday, July 23, 1992
Friday, July 24, 1992

Source:

Second round
Friday, July 24, 1992
Saturday, July 25, 1992

Source:

Third round
Saturday, July 25, 1992

Source:

Final round
Sunday, July 26, 1992

Source:

Playoff 
Monday, July 27, 1992

Scorecard

Source:

References

External links
Golf Observer final leaderboard
U.S. Women's Open Golf Championship

U.S. Women's Open
Golf in Pennsylvania
Sports competitions in Pennsylvania
U.S. Women's Open
U.S. Women's Open
U.S. Women's Open
Women's sports in Pennsylvania